Disco Extravaganza is the debut studio album by Swedish pop group Army of Lovers, released in 1990. In the US, the album was simply titled Army of Lovers and was released there the following year. A remastered version of the album was released in 2006.

Overview
The track list is slightly different for the US version. "Supernatural" and "Ride the Bullet" were presented in re-recorded versions, which later appeared on the band's second album Massive Luxury Overdose. The song "My Army of Lovers" was also included on that album. The track "Viva La Vogue" was used in the soundtrack of the comedy film Don't Tell Mom the Babysitter's Dead. "Birds of Prey" is a faithful rendition of the first section of the original "Birds of Prey", the first track on the United Artists 1976 album release New Nation, by Roderick Falconer. 

The album was first planned to be released only in Scandinavia, but in the winter of 1990/91 when the band performed on the Super Channel show, 40 million people in Japan watched them and the album was released there too. After four months, the album was still in the top 50 in Japan.

Critical reception
AllMusic editor Ned Raggett wrote that the band's self-titled release "fuses Eurodisco's pulse and sheen (and at points the all-important string swirls, as "Ride the Bullet" merrily shows) with gay abandon in all senses of the word. The Army doesn't quite hit the heights that Deee-Lite served up with its own delicious debut World Clique, from the same year, but comes awfully close. Earlier hits "Supernatural" and "Love Me Like a Loaded Gun" appear with a slew of similarly minded songs (great titles abound -- some standouts: "Mondo Trasho" and "I Am the Amazon"). [...] Quirky samples sneak in at points as well, from The Andy Griffith Shows whistled theme to the "ooga-chuckas" from "Hooked on a Feeling". Add to that such delectabilities as the French vocals on "Scorpio Rising" and random theremin noises, and the Army begins its mission in full effect." 

American magazine Billboard wrote, "Charming Swedish trio comes on like a cross between Depeche Mode and Abba on this sparkling debut, which is chockfull of spine-stirring Euro-dance grooves and radio-ready hooks. Although "My Army of Lovers" is starting to make noise, stronger tunes wait in the wings. "Love Me Like a Loaded Gun" glides with a techno-hip house beat, while "Ride the Bullet" is a festive disco anthem."

Track listing

Credits
Design [Sleeve] – Marie Sundström-Wollbeck 
Directed By [Video Clips] – Fredrik Boklund, Martin Persson 
Executive-Producer – Ola Håkansson 
Mixed By – Emil Hellman (tracks: 1 to 11, 13 to 15) 
Other [Additional Stage Costumes] – Henric Stacy 
Other [Hair And Make-Up] – Jean-Pierre Barda 
Other [Promotional Supervisor] – Jonas Holst 
Other [Stylist] – Camilla Thulin 
Photography By – Kent Billeqvist 
Programmed By – Magnus Frykberg (tracks: 1, 3 to 11, 13 to 15) 
Vocals, Bass – La Camilla 
Vocals, Computer – Alexander Bard 
Vocals, Drums – Jean-Pierre Barda

References

1990 debut albums
Army of Lovers albums